is a Japanese bank that is headquartered in Akita, Akita prefecture.  The bulk of the bank's business is in Akita prefecture, although it does operate branches in regional cities such as Morioka and Sendai, as well as a branch in Tokyo.  The bank's largest stakeholder is the Yamagata Prefecture-based FIDEA Holdings Co., Ltd, which currently controls 100 percent of the company stock.

Profile
Deposit Balance: Approximately 1.114 trillion yen 
Employees: 1,177
Branches: 82 (79 domestic, 3 overseas)
SWIFT code: HOKBJPJT
President: Eikichi Saito (from June 2008)
Membership:  Regional Banks Association of Japan

History
The forerunner to the Hokuto Bank was the Masuda Bank, established in Yokote, Akita Prefecture in 1895.  Although the Masuda Bank merged with several other banks throughout the first half of the 1900s, it changed its name to its present form in 1993 when it merged with the Akita Akebono Bank.  At the time of the merger, the name Komachi Bank was floated as a possible name, but was ultimately turned down in favor of the current form.  The bank has gradually diversified its range of financial services, and began to offer insurance in 2002.  In the early 2000s, the Hokuto Bank was involved numerous scandals, including embezzlement charges.  This prompted the Japanese Financial Services Agency to request a plan to improve its governance.  As a result, the Hokuto Bank has launched a series of initiatives, entitled Believe and, more recently, Breakthrough, to improve its governance.

Hokuto Bank SC

 is a Japanese football club based in Akita Prefecture. They play in the Tohoku Soccer League. Their team colour is yellow.

League record

Honours
Tohoku Soccer League D2 North:
Champions (2): 2000, 2002
Akita Prefecture League:
Champions (5): 1999, 2008, 2009, 2014, 2016

References

External links

  Official site
  Japan Financial Services Agency Announcement, February 7, 2003
  Bloomberg Report

Companies based in Akita Prefecture
Regional banks of Japan
Sports teams in Akita Prefecture
Sport in Akita (city)
Football clubs in Japan